The term TV-out is commonly used to label the connector of equipment providing an analog video signal acceptable for a television AV input. TV-out is different from AV-out in that it only provides video, no audio.

Types of signals and their respective connectors include:
Composite video
S-video
Component video

See AV input for more information.

Television technology
Graphics cards